Harold Augustus Judd (11 April 1880 – c. 1965) was a rugby union player who represented Australia.

Judd, a flanker, was born in Dawes Point, New South Wales and claimed a total of 5 international rugby caps for Australia. His debut game was against New Zealand, at Sydney, on 15 August 1903, however it wasn't a clean game for Judd as he was involved in an altercation with opposing player Reuben Cooke, further investigation proved Judd to be the guilty party but it is unknown what his punishment was.

References

Australian rugby union players
Australia international rugby union players
1880 births
1965 deaths
Rugby union flankers
Rugby union players from Sydney